Hiroi (written: 廣井) is a Japanese surname. Notable people with the surname include:

, Japanese alpine skier
, real name , Japanese manga artist
, Japanese footballer

Japanese-language surnames